Raymond Paul Baker (born 9 April 1954 in Carshalton) is an English former first-class cricketer active 1973–78 who played for Surrey.

References

External links

1954 births
Living people
Surrey cricketers
Cricketers from Carshalton
20th-century English people